Heinz Friedrich Ruppert Riesenhuber (born 1 December 1935) is a German politician (CDU) who served as Minister of Scientific Research under Chancellor Helmut Kohl from 1982 to 1993.

Life and education
Riesenhuber received his high school diploma (Abitur) in 1955 in Frankfurt am Main. He studied economics and chemistry until 1961. He had a scholarship of the catholic Cusanuswerk. From 1962 he worked for four years as a researcher in the department of chemistry at the Johann Wolfgang Goethe-Universität and earned a Doctorate degree in chemistry in 1965.

From 1966 to 1982 he worked for Metallgesellschaft AG, Frankfurt am Main. Within the Metallgesellschaft Group, he was CEO for the subsidiary "Erzgesellschaft mbH" (from 1968), and from 1971 to 1982 Chief technical officer of "Synthomer Chemie GmbH", another subsidiary.

He was co-president of the German-Japanese Cooperation Council for High-technology and Environmental Technology DJR in Bonn. Snce 1995 he is honorary professor at the University of Frankfurt and president of the German Parliamentary Union (Deutsche Parlamentarischen Gesellschaft) since 2006.

Riesenhuber is a member of several governing boards and advisory committees of German and foreign companies and institutes. He lives in Frankfurt-Unterliederbach, is married and has four children.

Political career
Riesenhuber became a member of the Christian Democratic Union (CDU) in 1961. Between 1965 and 1969 he was head of the youth organization of CDU (Junge Union) in Hessen. He was chairman of CDU Frankfurt from 1973 to 1978. In 1979 he was elected as a chairman of CDU district Untermain (now FrankfurtRheinMain).

From 1976 to 2017, he served as a member of the federal German legislature, the Bundestag. At first he was elected via the Landesliste ("state list"), then from 1980 he represented the electoral district Frankfurt am Main I - Main-Taunus and since 2002 the district Main-Taunus. This period of over 40 years has made him the third-longest member, after Wolfgang Schäuble and Richard Stücklen. In the elections of 2009 he attained 47,5 % of the votes, in 2013 52,5 %.

On 4 October 1982 he was appointed Minister of Scientific Research by chancellor Helmut Kohl. He served as such until 21 January 1993. During this time he supported the Transrapid and the wind turbine Growian.

In 2009 he became the 17th Alterspräsident (Father of the House) of the Bundestag due to his status as the oldest member of the legislature. He continued to hold this post in the following legislature. In 2017 he did not run for parliament again.

Honors
Riesenhuber earned an Honorary degree Dr. h.c. from
 Weizmann Institute of Science in Rehovot (Israel)
 University of Krakau (Poland)
 University of Surrey (England), 1993
 University of Göttingen, 1997
He was given a number of awards, including
 Order of Merit of the Federal Republic of Germany
 Grand Officer of the Legion of Honour (France)
 Decoration of Honour for Services to the Republic of Austria
 Order of the Sacred Treasure (Japan)

Trivia
His personal brand is his Bow tie. He always wears such a tie. In his political campaigns for the Bundestag he used a poster showing only a bow tie in the national colours of Germany: Black, red and gold. Neither his name nor his party was mentioned but everybody in his constituency recognized Riesenhuber.

References

External links 

Biography on the Website of the German Bundestag 

German Roman Catholics
Members of the Bundestag for Hesse
Education ministers of Germany
Living people
1935 births
Knights Commander of the Order of Merit of the Federal Republic of Germany
Members of the European Academy of Sciences and Arts
Alterspräsidents of the Bundestag
Members of the Bundestag 2013–2017
Members of the Bundestag 2009–2013
Members of the Bundestag 2005–2009
Members of the Bundestag 2002–2005
Members of the Bundestag 1998–2002
Members of the Bundestag 1994–1998
Members of the Bundestag 1990–1994
Members of the Bundestag 1987–1990
Members of the Bundestag 1983–1987
Members of the Bundestag 1980–1983
Members of the Bundestag 1976–1980
Members of the Bundestag for the Christian Democratic Union of Germany
Science ministers